{{DISPLAYTITLE:C15H22O5}}
The molecular formula C15H22O5 (molar mass: 282.33 g/mol) may refer to: 

 Artemisinin, a drug used to treat multi-drug resistant strains of falciparum malaria
 Octyl gallate, an antioxidant and food preservative

Molecular formulas